The Bayer designation Phi Cancri (φ Cnc / φ Cancri) is shared by a star and star system, in the constellation Cancer:
 φ1 Cancri
 φ2 Cancri
They are separated by 0.96° on the sky.

Cancri, Phi
Cancer (constellation)